Despoina Papavasilaki (born 24 March 1973) is a Greek athlete. She competed in the women's long jump at the 2000 Summer Olympics.

References

1973 births
Living people
Athletes (track and field) at the 2000 Summer Olympics
Greek female long jumpers
Olympic athletes of Greece
Place of birth missing (living people)